Gintaras Grušas (born 23 September 1961) is a Lithuanian–American prelate of the Catholic Church. A bishop since 2010, he has been the archbishop of Vilnius, Lithuania, since April 2013.

Biography
Grušas was born in Washington, D.C., on 23 September 1961. His parents had reunited only a year earlier after 16 years apart when his mother was able to leave the Soviet Union and join his father in the United States. The family relocated to California and raised their son in Agoura. He earned a BS degree in Mathematics and Information Science at the University of California at Los Angeles (UCLA). He spent five years working as a technical consultant in marketing for IBM, which, he said, helped prepare him for the management and project-planning skills that a pastor needs.

Grušas began his preparation for the priesthood at the Franciscan University of Steubenville in Steubenville, Ohio. He then earned a Bachelor of Sacred Theology degree at the Pontifical University of Saint Thomas Aquinas (Angelicum) in 1994. He was ordained a priest on 25 June 1994.

After his ordination he worked as secretary-general of the Episcopal Conference of Lithuania until 1997. He earned a Licentiate of Canon Law in 1999 and a Doctorate of Canon Law in 2001 from the Angelicum. From 2001 to 2003 he was rector of the seminary in Vilnius.

On 2 July 2010, Pope Benedict XVI named him Military Ordinary of Lithuania and he was consecrated a bishop on 4 September.

On 5 April 2013, Pope Francis appointed him Archbishop of Vilnius to succeed Cardinal Audrys Juozas Bačkis. He was installed there on 23 April 2013.

On 9 June 2014 he was named a member of the Congregation for the Clergy and on 13 July 2016 of the Secretariat for Communications.

He was elected president of the Episcopal Conference of Lithuania on 28 October 2014. On 26 September 2021, he was elected President of the Council of the Bishops' Conferences of Europe.

References

External links

 

Living people
1961 births
21st-century Roman Catholic archbishops in Lithuania
Roman Catholic archbishops of Vilnius
University of California, Los Angeles alumni
Franciscan University of Steubenville alumni
Pontifical University of Saint Thomas Aquinas alumni
Members of the Congregation for the Clergy
Military Ordinary of Lithuania